Cercinthus elegans is a species of bugs in the tribe Coreini. It is found in the Canary Islands.

References

External links 

 
 
 Cercinthus elegans at eu-nomen.eu

Coreini
Insects described in 1839
Fauna of the Canary Islands
Taxa named by Gaspard Auguste Brullé